The 2008–09 season was Schalke 04's 41st season in the Bundesliga. This article shows player statistics and all matches (official and friendly) that the club played during the 2008–09 season.

Players

Squad information

Transfers

In

Out

Squad statistics

Appearances and goals

Disciplinary record

Club

Coaching staff

Other information

Kits

Competitions

Overall
As in the last two seasons, Schalke 04 was present in all major competitions, including the First division and the DFB Cup in Germany but they failed to qualify for the UEFA Champions League in Europe.

Bundesliga

Standings

Results summary

Results by round

Matches

Competitive

See also
FC Schalke 04
2008–09 UEFA Champions League
2008–09 Bundesliga
2008–09 DFB-Pokal

External links
Schalke04.de Official Site
Bundesliga.de Team Page
Fussballdaten.de Team Page 
uefa.com - UEFA Champions League
FIFA

Notes

Schalke 04
FC Schalke 04 seasons